Karate was introduced as a World Games sport at the 1981 World Games in Santa Clara, California.

Medalists

Men

Kata

Kumite −60 kg

Kumite −65 kg

Kumite −67 kg

Kumite −70 kg

Kumite −75 kg

Kumite −80 kg

Kumite −84 kg

Kumite +80 kg

Kumite +84 kg

Kumite open

Women

Kata

Kumite −50 kg

Kumite −53 kg

Kumite −55 kg

Kumite −60 kg

Kumite −61 kg

Kumite −68 kg

Kumite +60 kg

Kumite +68 kg

Kumite open

See also

External links
 World Games at Sports123 by Internet Archive
 2005 World Games info system
 Karate Records - World Games

 
World Games
Karate